Watson-Guptill is an American publisher of instructional books in the arts.

History
The company was founded in 1937 by Ernest Watson, Ralph Reinhold, and Arthur L. Guptill. They also published the magazine American Artist. Their headquarters are at 1745 Broadway, New York City, Random House Tower.

Billboard Publications acquired Watson-Guptill in 1962. The Dutch publisher VNU (later renamed the Nielsen Company) acquired Billboard in 1993. Random House acquired Watson-Guptill from Nielsen in 2008. Five years later, Random House, which was owned by Bertelsmann and the Penguin Group, owned by Pearson PLC, merged to form the Penguin Random House company. Watson-Guptill became an imprint of Ten Speed Press in 2013.

Imprints
Amphoto Books

References

External links

Penguin Random House Canada page
Watson Biography

Random House
Book publishing companies based in New York (state)
Publishing companies established in 1937
Penguin Random House